Route 3 is a  long, two-lane uncontrolled access secondary highway in Prince Edward Island, Canada.  Its maximum speed limit is 90 km/h (55 mph).

Route 3, also known locally as the Montague Road or the Georgetown Road, connects the most populated part of Kings County (the Montague-Georgetown area) with Charlottetown.

Major intersections

References

Prince Edward Island provincial highways
Roads in Kings County, Prince Edward Island
Roads in Queens County, Prince Edward Island